Tonna dolium, common name the spotted tun, is a species of large sea snail or tun snail, a marine gastropod mollusc in the family Tonnidae, the tun shells.

Description
The size of the shell varies between 100 mm and 181 mm.

The thin shell is ovate-globose and ventricose. The spire is generally short. It is composed of six whorls, slightly flattened above. The body whorl is large and very convex. All these whorls are encircled by wide and distant ribs, slightly convex, numbering ten  upon the body whorl.  Others, more narrow, are placed alternately within the furrows, which are wide and very slightly striated. The surface of this shell is of a white color, slightly grayish, and sometimes rose-colored. It is ornamented upon the ribs, with alternate white and red spots, often also orange, which, disposed thus in regular series, present a beautiful appearance. The aperture is very large, colored within of a chestnut tint. The outer lip is thin, notched, canaliculated within, and its edge is white and undulated. The inner lip is only slightly perceptible towards the base, where it forms a part of the umbilicus, which is hardly developed. The columella is twisted spirally, and furnished externally, even to the emargination of the base, with longitudinal ribs.

Its ribs, wide and distant, its furrows equally wide, render it easily distinguishable.<ref name="Kiener">Kiener (1840). General species and iconography of recent shells : comprising the Massena Museum, the collection of Lamarck, the collection of the Museum of Natural History, and the recent discoveries of travellers; Boston :W.D. Ticknor,1837 (described as  'Dolium maculatum)</ref>

Distribution
This marine species occurs in the Indo-West Pacific off Tanzania, the Mascarene Basin and off the Philippines.

References

 Linnaeus, C. 1758. Systemae naturae per regna tria naturae, secundum classes, ordines, genera, species, cum characteribus, differetiis, synonymis, locis.v. Holmiae : Laurentii Salvii 824 pp. 
 Martini, F.H.W. 1777. Neues systematisches Conchylien-Cabinet, fortgesetzt durch Johann Heironymus Chemnitz. Nürnberg : G. N. Raspe Vol. 3 vi + 1-434, pls 66-121.
 Röding, P.F. 1798. Museum Boltenianum sive Catalogus cimeliorum e tribus regnis naturae quae olim collegerat Joa. Hamburg : Trappii 199 pp.
 Lamarck, J.B.P.A. de M. 1822. Histoire naturelle des Animaux sans Vertèbres. Paris : J.B. Lamarck Vol. 7 711 pp.
 Springsteen, F.J. & Leobrera, F.M. 1986. Shells of the Philippines. Manila : Carfel Seashell Museum 377 pp., 100 pls.
 Drivas, J.; Jay, M. (1987). Coquillages de La Réunion et de l'Île Maurice. Collection Les Beautés de la Nature. Delachaux et Niestlé: Neuchâtel. . 159 pp.
 Wilson, B. 1993. Australian Marine Shells. Prosobranch Gastropods. Kallaroo, Western Australia : Odyssey Publishing Vol. 1 408 pp.
 Vos, C. & Terryn, Y. in Poppe, G.T. & Groh, K. (eds) 2007. A Conchological Iconography. The family Tonnidae''. Hackenheim, Germany : ConchBooks pp. 1–121, 63 pls.

External links
 World Register of Marine Species entry

Further reading 
 Powell A. W. B., William Collins Publishers Ltd, Auckland 1979 

Tonnidae
Gastropods described in 1822